Acharya Narendra Deva University of Agriculture and Technology (ANDUaT), formerly Narendra Deva University of Agriculture and Technology (NDUaT), is a university located in Kumarganj, Uttar Pradesh, India, established in 1975. It is named after the politician and educator Narendra Deva, who served as vice chancellor of the University of Lucknow and Banaras Hindu University. It has constituent colleges in Ambedkar Nagar district and Azamgarh district.

History

The foundation stone of was laid on 15 January 1974, by Prime Minister Indira Gandhi at Mashodha near Faizabad. Laxmi Narain Rai was the first  officer on special duty, succeeded by A.S. Srivastava in October 1974 and by the first vice-chancellor, A.D. Pandey in October 1975. In the same year the government of Uttar Pradesh decided that the main campus of the university would be established at Kumarganj, (Faizabad) Ayodhya instead of Mashodha. The university started functioning in a borrowed building of Gram Swalabi Vidyalaya Acharya Nagar, Naka, Faizabad.

The Mahamaya College of Agriculture Engineering and Technology was established in 2002 at Ambedkarnagar by upgrading the department of Agriculture Engineering in the College of Agriculture.

Constituent colleges
The university includes the following constituent colleges:
 College of Agriculture, Kumarganj, Faizabad
 Mahamaya College of Agricultural Engineering and Technology, Akbarpur, Ambedkar Nagar
 College of Fisheries, Kumarganj, Faizabad
 College of Home Science, Kumarganj, Faizabad
 College of Horticulture and Forestry, Kumarganj, Faizabad
 College of Veterinary Science & Animal Husbandry, Kumarganj, Faizabad
 College of Agriculture, Azamgarh

References

External links
 

Agricultural universities and colleges in Uttar Pradesh
Faizabad district
Educational institutions established in 1975
1975 establishments in Uttar Pradesh